Mississippi Mermaid is a 1969 French romantic drama film written and directed by François Truffaut and starring Catherine Deneuve and Jean-Paul Belmondo. Adapted from the 1947 novel Waltz into Darkness by Cornell Woolrich, the film is about a tobacco planter on Réunion Island in the Indian Ocean who becomes engaged through correspondence to a woman he does not know. When she arrives it is not the same woman in the photo, but he marries her anyway. Filmed in southern France and Réunion island, Mississippi Mermaid was the 17th highest-grossing film of the year in France with a total of 1,221,027 admissions. It was remade in 2001 as Original Sin, directed by Michael Cristofer and starring Angelina Jolie and Antonio Banderas.

Plot
Louis Mahé (Jean-Paul Belmondo), a wealthy tobacco plantation owner on Réunion Island in the Indian Ocean, awaits the arrival of his bride-to-be, Julie Roussel (Catherine Deneuve), whom he has never met. They became acquainted through the personals column of a French newspaper and have been corresponding. At the Hotel Mascarin, he meets his business partner Jardine who accompanies him to pick up the ring. Louis drives to the dock to greet Julie who is arriving on the steamer Mississipi (spelled with one p according to the French spelling of the river at the time) from Nouméa, the capital of New Caledonia. When they meet, he is surprised by her beauty and does not recognize her; she is not the woman in the photo that she had sent him. She explains that she sent the photo of a neighbor to ensure his sincerity. He confesses that he too has not told the complete truth, having hidden that he was wealthy.

They quickly marry, and his adoration makes him overlook inconsistencies between her comments and her letters. He gives Julie access to his bank accounts and prints her image on the cigarette packs his company manufactures. After receiving an angry letter from Julie's sister, Berthe Roussel (Nelly Borgeaud), demanding to know Julie's whereabouts, Louis returns home to find that Julie has gone with nearly 28 million francs, all but emptying his bank accounts. Soon after, Berthe arrives and informs him that his wife was not Julie and that she saw her sister board the Mississipi. They hire a private detective, Comolli, to track down the impostor.

On a flight to Nice, France, Louis collapses from exhaustion. While recuperating in the Clinique Heurtebise sanitarium, he sees Julie('s impostor) on television, dancing at a nightclub in Antibes. He buys a gun and travels to Antibes where he breaks into her room at the Hotel Monorail, intent on killing her. When she returns and is confronted by Louis, she offers no resistance. Explaining that her real name is Marion Vergano, she tells him of her sordid past; of her years in prison and association with a heartless gangster, Richard, who was with her on the Mississipi. She recounts that when they met Julie Roussel and learned of her forthcoming marriage, Richard fabricated a plot to kill Julie and send Marion in her place to rob Louis. Afterwards Richard forced her to go through with the robbery and then abandoned her. She tells Louis that she loves him, and Louis forgives her.

They buy a convertible and drive to Aix-en-Provence, where they move into a house and spend their days traveling the region and making love. Their happiness is interrupted by Comolli, who has arrived in Aix on the trail of the impostor. After failing to bribe the detective to drop the case, Louis shoots him dead and buries him in the wine cellar. Louis and Marion flee to Lyon, but she grows dissatisfied with their fugitive existence and longs for a life of luxury in Paris. Louis returns briefly to Réunion and sells his share in the plantation to his partner, Jardine. Upon his return he finds the police on their trail. Again they are forced to flee, leaving most of his money behind.

They head into the mountains where they find an isolated cabin. They hope to cross into Switzerland, but Marion is unhappy with their life on the run. Louis becomes increasingly ill and, after nearly collapsing, suspects that Marion has been poisoning his coffee. He attempts to escape, but Marion brings him back. As she pours him another glass of coffee, he reveals his knowledge of her plan, accepts his fate with no regrets, and expresses his love for her. Ashamed at her actions, Marion knocks the glass from Louis' hand and vows to make amends. She acknowledges that no woman deserves to be so loved, but assures him that she loves him, too, and that they can still go away together. Crying in his arms, Marion tells him, "I'm learning what love is, Louis. It's painful." After Louis regains his strength, they leave in a snowstorm and head toward the border.

Cast
Jean-Paul Belmondo as Louis Mahé
Catherine Deneuve as Julie Roussel / Marion Vergano
Michel Bouquet as Comolli
Nelly Borgeaud as Berthe Roussel
Marcel Berbert as Jardine
Martine Ferrière as the Landlady
Yves Drouhet as the Detective
Roland Thénot as Richard

Production

Filming locations
Aix-en-Provence, Bouches-du-Rhône, France 
Antibes, Alpes-Maritimes, France 
Grenoble, Isère, France
Le Tampon, Réunion 
Lyon, Rhône, Rhône-Alpes, France 
Nice, Alpes-Maritimes, France 
Saint-Denis, Réunion
Sainte-Anne, Réunion 
Sainte-Suzanne, Réunion

Reception

Box Office
The film was the 16th most popular movie at the French box office in 1969.

Critical response
In his review in The New York Times, Vincent Canby wrote that the film "defies easy definition and blithely triumphs over what initially appears to be structural schizophrenia." Canby noted the performances of Belmondo, Deneuve, and Bouquet, which were "played with marvelous style." Canby concluded: 

In his review in the San Francisco Chronicle in 1999, film critic Edward Guthmann praised the film, writing: 

The film had many detractors. Dennis Schwartz, wrote:

On Rotten Tomatoes, the film has an approval rating of 82% based on 17 reviews.

References
Citations

Further reading

External links

Mississippi Mermaid at Le Film Guide

1969 romantic drama films
Films based on American novels
Films directed by François Truffaut
Films set in France
Films set in Réunion
1960s French-language films
French neo-noir films
United Artists films
Films with screenplays by François Truffaut
Films based on works by Cornell Woolrich
French romantic drama films
Poisoning in film
1960s French films